The Pennsylvania Line was a formation within the Continental Army. The term "Pennsylvania Line" referred to the quota of numbered infantry regiments assigned to Pennsylvania at various times by the Continental Congress. These, together with similar contingents from the other twelve states, formed the Continental Line. The concept was particularly important in relation to the promotion of commissioned officers. Officers of the Continental Army below the rank of brigadier general were ordinarily ineligible for promotion except in the line of their own state.

Not all Continental infantry regiments raised in a state were part of a state quota, however. On December 27, 1776, the Continental Congress gave Washington temporary control over certain military decisions that the Congress ordinarily regarded as its own prerogative. These "dictatorial powers" included the authority to raise sixteen additional Continental infantry regiments at large.

Early in 1777, Washington offered command of one of these additional regiments to Thomas Hartley of Pennsylvania, who accepted. Hartley had formerly been lieutenant colonel of the 6th Pennsylvania Battalion. Hartley's Additional Continental Regiment was allotted to the Pennsylvania Line on March 27, 1778. On January 13, 1779, it absorbed Patton's Regiment and was designated the 11th Pennsylvania Regiment. The latter was called the "New Eleventh Pennsylvania Regiment" as the original 11th Pennsylvania Regiment had been consolidated with the 10th Pennsylvania Regiment on July 1, 1778.

Washington also offered command to John Patton of Pennsylvania, who accepted leadership of Patton's Additional Continental Regiment. In 1776, Patton had commanded a battalion of the Pennsylvania State Rifle Regiment.

Half of Malcolm's Additional Continental Regiment was drawn from New York and half from Pennsylvania.

Still other Continental infantry regiments and smaller units, also unrelated to a state quota, were raised as needed for special or temporary service. Nelson's and Doyle's Independent Rifle Companies were examples of such "extra" units.

Pennsylvania Line, 1776
1st Pennsylvania Battalion
2d Pennsylvania Battalion
3d Pennsylvania Battalion
4th Pennsylvania Battalion
5th Pennsylvania Battalion
6th Pennsylvania Battalion

Pennsylvania Line, 1777
1st Pennsylvania Regiment
2nd Pennsylvania Regiment
3rd Pennsylvania Regiment
4th Pennsylvania Regiment
5th Pennsylvania Regiment
6th Pennsylvania Regiment
7th Pennsylvania Regiment
8th Pennsylvania Regiment
9th Pennsylvania Regiment
10th Pennsylvania Regiment
11th Pennsylvania Regiment
12th Pennsylvania Regiment
13th Pennsylvania Regiment
14th Pennsylvania Regiment

External links
Pennsylvania Archives
Wright, Robert K. Jr. The Continental Army. Washington, D.C.: United States Army Center of Military History, 1983. Available online.
Bibliography of the Continental Army in Pennsylvania compiled by the United States Army Center of Military History

Pennsylvania regiments of the Continental Army